Hauterives is a commune in the Drôme department in southeastern France. It is home to Ferdinand Cheval's self-made Palais idéal.

Geography
The Galaure flows southwest through the middle of the commune.

Population

See also
Communes of the Drôme department

References

Communes of Drôme